Pavagadh is an ancient Triassic Period location with Enriched History from periods of Treta Yuga and Dvapara Yuga.

It is known for a famous Mahakali temple which draws thousands of pilgrims every day. It is a tribal area populated predominantly by the Rathwas. The area of this locality Champaner-Pavagadh Archaeological Park was inscribed by UNESCO as a World Heritage Site in 2004.

History
It is said that king Vanraj Chavda established Champaner at the foot of Pavagadh in fond memory of his wise minister Champa. Later, the Patai Raval family ruled it and took care of the boundary. The folk tales say that Mahakali assumed the form of a woman and danced in a Garba during Navaratri. The last Patai, Jaisinh watched her with dirty looks. The deity became angry at Jaisinh and cursed him that the town will fall. The Muslim emperor of Gujarat, Mahmud Begada assaulted Pavagadh and won the hill on the boundary in the 15th century.

Patai was defeated and killed. Mahmud Begada shifted his capital from Ahmedabad to Champaner for some time for reasons of diplomacy. He developed the town by constructing buildings such as the fort of Champaner, Uohra mosque, Mandavi, Kirtistambh, the temple of Shalkh, Jama Masjid, Nagina Mosque, and Kevda Mosque. The remains of the Palace of Begada are still found near Vad Talav (Banyan Pond) two kilometers (1.25 miles) away from Champaner by road.

The government has granted many concessions and offered subsidies to the new industries coming up in this area. As a result of it, Halol and Kalol towns near Pavagadh have turned into virtual industrial estates. A film studio at Halol has this added advantage.

Geography

Pavagadh is the gateway to Panchmahal. The locations of hilly areas around Halol provide good scenery. Pavagadh Hill has total height of 822 meters and you can find many scenic trails to climb including waterfalls during monsoon time. On the hill's eastern side, the Rangpur Ashram run by Mr. Hari Parikh works towards the upliftment of the local tribals. The plateau at an altitude of 490 meters is known as Machi Haveli. The bus service has been extended up to Machi.

Notable people
The great music maestro of 16th century, and Tansen's contemporary rival, Baiju Bawra belonged to Champaner.

Places of interest

Pavagadh Jain Temple: The temples of Jainism at Pavagadh are noteworthy. They fall into three different groups: The first consists of the Bhavanaderi temples near the Naqqarkhana gate called the Navalakka temples, the second group is in honor of the Tirthankaras Suparshvanatha and Chandraprabhu and the third group, situated on the southeast of Pavagadh Hill (Mataji's cliff), is near the Pārśva temple next to the Dudhia tank. On the basis of their "stylistic and architectural features", the date of construction of these temples is deduced to be the 14th–15th centuries. The temple is made up of pure white stone with elaborately carved seated and standing images of the Jain pantheon are seen on the outer walls of the temples. 
 Kalikamata Temple, a famous Hindu pilgrim centre, is located at Pavagadh. Situated amid dense forest cover on a cliff, the temple is believed to be one of the 51 Shakti Peeths. Maa Mahakalika Udan Khotala (A Passenger Ropeway) is operating since 1986 and takes you quickly and comfortably from Manchi to the hilltop near the Maha Kalika Temple in about 6 minutes, whereas, the steep climb on foot takes over one hour. The temple of Kali is at the height of 550 metres (1,523 feet). A rope-way facility has been made available (commissioned in 1986) to the tourists to reach the temple. About 250 steps have to be climbed from there.
 The remains of the Raval Palace still exist at Machi. There are rest houses, holiday homes and small hotels at Machi.
 Then comes Teliya Talav and Dudhia Talav.
There are numerous tales, songs and dramas knitting the story of Patai Raval.

 Dhaba Dungri is also a famous Shiva Temple located on the way from Halol to Pavagadh. It is also known as "Tapobhumi" of Maharshi Vishwamitra.
 "Virasat Van" is also a beautiful garden located at footstep of Pavagadh.
 Must Visit places also includes "Vada Talav" & "Kabooter Khana" located at footstep of Pavagadh.

References

Hill stations in Gujarat
Forts in Gujarat
Tourist attractions in Panchmahal district
Hindu pilgrimage sites in India